Wiktoria Kiszkis (born 14 June 2003) is a Polish footballer, who plays as a forward for Ślask Wrocław on loan from West Ham United of the English FA WSL.

Early life
Kiszkis was born in Iława, Poland. Her father Michał moved to London in 2004 and he was joined by Kiszkis and her mother Agnieszka the following year. Kiszkis displayed an aptitude for football and was accepted into the Arsenal academy. In 2018–19 she played 13 times for Arsenal's youth team, scoring 30 goals and serving 23 assists.

Club career
Kiszkis joined West Ham United ahead of their 2019–20 season. She made her senior debut on 20 October 2019, as a 77th-minute substitute for Kate Longhurst in a 2–2 FA Women's League Cup draw with Tottenham Hotspur. Her first appearance in the FA Women's Super League came on 17 November 2019 at Manchester City, when she replaced Adriana Leon in injury time. She registered one shot, hitting the post in a 5–0 defeat.

International career
In September 2017 Kiszkis debuted for the Poland under-15 team, scoring in a 1–1 draw with the Czech Republic. As a 14-year-old, Kiszkis was part of the under-17 squad to contest the 2018 UEFA Women's Under-17 Championship and later captained the team in 2019.

Career statistics

Club
.

References

External links
 

2003 births
Living people
Polish women's footballers
West Ham United F.C. Women players
Women's association football forwards
Expatriate women's footballers in England
Polish expatriate sportspeople in England
People from Iława
Women's Super League players